Kabardian grammar refers to the whole system and structure of East Circassian (Kabardian) language.

Ergative–absolutive

Kabardian is an ergative–absolutive language. Unlike nominative–accusative languages, such as English, where the single argument of an intransitive verb ("She" in the sentence "She walks.") behaves grammatically like the agent of a transitive verb ("She" in the sentence "She finds it."), in ergative–absolutive language the subject of an intransitive verb behaves like the object of a transitive verb, and differently from the agent of a transitive verb. For example, the word щӏалэ "boy" in the intransitive sentence щӏалэр малӏэ "the boy dies" behaves grammatically different from the word щӏалэ "boy" in the transitive sentence щӏалэм ар еукӏы "the boy kills it".

Nouns in Kabardian can have the following roles in a sentence:
Ergative case: Marked as -м /-m/, it serves to mark the one that causes change by doing the verb.
Absolutive case: Marked as -р /-r/, it serves to mark the one that is changed by the verb's, i.e. it is being created, altered, moved or ended by the verb.
Oblique case: Also marked as -м /-m/, it serves to mark the dative and applicative case roles. It acts as the indirect object in the sentence and its state is not changed by the verb, i.e. we have no indication of what happens to it or how it behaves after the verb.

In intransitive verbs the subject is in the absolutive case thus it indicates that the subject is changing (created, altered, moved or ended).

In this example the boy is changing by moving:

In this example the man is changing by moving. The verb еуэн /jawan/ "to hit" describes the movement of hitting  and not the impact itself, so we have no indication of what happens to the object (the wall in this case).

In transitive verbs the subject is in the ergative case thus it indicates that the subject causes change to the object which gets the absolutive case.

In this example the wall changes by being destroyed (it was altered). The verb къутэн /qʷətan/ "to destroy" does not indicate how the subject (boy) destroyed the wall thus we have no indication of the boy changing, making him the one that causes the change (and not the one that changes).

In this example the rock changes by moving (motion in air), the man causes the change and the wall acts as the indirect object of the preposition.

It is important to distinguish between the intransitive and transitive verb, because the subject and object noun cases as well as the sentences' verb conjunctions (the prefixes that indicate person) depend on it. A fault in this can change the meaning of the sentence drastically, switching the roles of the subject and object. For instance, look at the following two sentences:

Even though the noun cases of the word boy кӏалэ are the same (In the Ergative-Oblique case marked as -м), they behave grammatically different because the verb еплъын "to look" is considered an intransitive verb in contrast to the verb елъэгъун "to see" which is transitive.

Noun

Singular and plural

A Circassian noun can be in one of the following two states: singular or plural

Singular number is marked by a null morpheme, while plural nouns use the -хэ suffix, which is attached to the main form of the word. A noun in its plural form must be in its definite form, meaning it must include case markers such as -р or -м.

For example: singular: 
 унэ: home → унэхэр homes
 тхылъ: book → тхылъхэр books

Names and vocative uses of a noun are exempt of this rule.

 къардэнхэ лъэпкъышхуэщ: The Kardan(ov)s are a large family/tribe
 фымыпIащIэ, цIыкIухэ!: Don't hurry, children!
 ныбжьэгъухэ, зэIущIэм зыкъыкIэрывмыгъэху!: Comrades, don't be late for the meeting!

However, the plural marking on the noun is optional in most cases. It is however frequently encoded in other parts of the sentence which are mandatory, for example the verb or possessive marking. 
 сабийм жеIэ: the child speaks vs сабийм жаIэ: the children speak
 сабийм и хьэл: the child's character vs сабийм я хьэл: the children's character

As a side note, the suffix -хэ is also present in verbs to denote that the absolutive participant is plural. However similarly, it is only optional. For example: 
 ар макӏуэ he is going → ахэр макӏуэхэ: they are going

Collective nouns
Collective nouns, such as жылэ village, къуажэ village, хьэблэ district, унагуэ family, are noteworthy, in regards to the usage of the plural. All of them, can also refer to the members of that group and if they do the noun acts as a plurale tantum which can't have.
 жылэм я Iэр яIэтмэ, сэри си Iэр сIэтынщ: if the villagers vote, I will also vote (lit. if the villagers raise their hands, I will raise my hand too)
 ар мы жылэм щопсэу: he lives in this village

Definite and indefinite forms
Circassian nouns usually have either definite or indefinite form. The idea behind this concept is close to the idea of definite/indefinite articles in English. The definite form of Circassian nouns have -р or -м 
(noun cases) formats at the end of the word. For example: щӏалэ "boy" – indefinite noun (has none of the definite formats) – it can be used in generalizations or when the boy is unknown to either the "speaker" or "listener" (a/an or zero article in English); щӏалэр, щӏалэм "the boy" – it is used when the mentioned boy is well known to both the "speaker" and "listener".

Noun cases
Kabardian also declines nouns into four different cases, each with corresponding suffixes: absolutive, ergative, instrumental, and adverbial.

Absolutive case
Has the suffix -р  (e.g. щӏалэр  'the boy', щӏалэхэр  ('the boys'), шыр  'the horse'). The absolutive case usually expresses subject in conjunction with intransitive verbs or direct object in conjunction with transitive verbs: For example:

In the following example, Щӏалэр is in the absolutive case, it points to the subject (the boy), and the sentence is in the absolutive form with an intransitive verb (кӏуащ);

In the following example, джанэр is in the absolutive case, it points to the direct object (the shirt which is being laundered), and the sentence is in the ergative form (after the form of its subject – Бзылъфыгъэм) with a transitive verb (егыкӏы).

Ergative case
Has the suffix -м  (e.g. щӏалэм  'the boy's', щӏалэхэмэ  'the boys'', шым  'the horse's). This case has two roles: Ergative role and Oblique role.

The Ergative role functions as subject in conjunction with transitive verbs.

The Oblique role functions as indirect object with both transitive and intransitive verbs. 

An example with an intransitive verb йоджэ "reads" and indirect object тхылъым "book".

An example with an transitive verb реты "gives" and indirect object пшъашъэм "girl".

The Ergative-Oblique case can also be used as an adverbial modifier. For example: 
 Студентхэм махуэм ӏуэху ящӏащ: "The students have worked during the day" (махуэм – adverbial modifier of time).
 Щӏалэхэр мэзым кӏуахэщ: "The boys went to the forest" (мэзым – adverbial modifier of place).

Instrumental-Directional Case
Indefinite nouns are marked by the affix -кӏэ : тхылъ-кӏэ, "by/with book", ӏэ-кӏэ "by/with hand". definite nouns express this case using the ergative affix -м in conjunction with the affix -кӏэ: уадэ-м-кӏэ "by/with the hammer", тхылъ-м-кӏэ "by/with the book".

The Instrumental case can also mark the direction of action:
 гъуэгу /ʁʷaɡʷ/ road → гъуэгумкӏэ /ʁʷaɡʷəmt͡ʃʼa/ from the road (direction).
 унэ /wəna/ house → унэмкӏэ /wənamt͡ʃʼa/ from the house.
 хы /xə/ sea → хымкӏэ /xəmt͡ʃʼa/ from the sea (direction).

Adverbial case
Has the suffix -уэ , or -у  (e.g. щӏалу   'boy'). The adverbial case usually expresses a transition into something, or definition (clarification, which often works like the English words -which, -who, -that... ) of a name. It points to the real (literal, not grammatical) subject in the sentence. For example:

Pro-drop
Kabardian is a pro-drop language. The subject and the object pronouns are sometimes omitted when verb conjugations reflect number and person.

 Both subject and object are mentioned :

 If the direct object is not mentioned :

 If the subject is not mentioned :

 If both subject and object are not mentioned :

Noun and adjective
In Kabardian, if a noun is accompanied by an adjective, the adjective is always placed right after the noun and also gets the grammatical role suffixes instead of the noun.

Absolutive case 

Ergative case

Instrumental case

Participle
In Kabardian someone (person) or something (animal, plant, object) that does a specific verb (or something happened to him/it) can be represented with the verb word with the additional suffix -э (a) (for present tense -рэ (-ra)). For example:
макӏуэ /maːkʷ'a/ – he is going → кӏуэр /kʷʼar/ – (one), who is going
машхэхэ /maːʃxaxa/ – they are eating → шхэхэр /ʃxaxar/ – (ones), who are eating.
лэжьащ /ɮaʑaːɕ/ – he worked → лэжьар /ɮaʑaːr/ – (one), who worked.
лӏэнущ /ɬʼanəwɕ/ – he will die → лӏэнур /ɬʼanəwr/ – (one), who will die.

Creating nouns from adjective
In Kabardian someone (person) or something (animal, plant, object) that have a specific adjective can be presented with the adjective word with the additional noun case suffix (absolutive, ergative, etc.) For example:
дахэ /daːxa/ – pretty → дахэр /daːxar/ – the pretty person (absolutive case).
ӏэфӏ /ʔafʼə/ – tasty → ӏэфӏэр /ʔafʼar / – the tasty ones (absolutive case).
щӏыӏэ /ɕʼəʔa/ – cold → щӏыӏэм /ɕʼəʔam/ – in the cold (ergative case).

Possessive
Possessive cases are one of the most important grammatical characteristics of nouns in the Circassian language. Singular Circassian nouns of the proprietary form are expressed by the following prefixes:

Plural nouns have these prefixes:

Demonstratives
Kabardian has three demonstratives: а /ʔaː/, мо /mo/ and мы /mə/.

а /ʔaː/
 that
  — that table
  — that girl
  — that boy is saying
 The determiner  /ʔaː/ refer to a referent that is far away and invisible to both the speaker and the listener(s). It is similar to the English language determiner that, but with the condition that the referent has to be invisible or far away.

мо /maw/
 that
  — that table
  — that girl
  — that boy is saying
 The determiner  refer to a referent that is visible and in a known distance from both the speaker and the listener(s) (both the speaker and the listener(s) can see the referent). It is similar to the English language determiner that, but with the condition that the referent has to be visible.

мы /mə/
 this
  — this table
  — this girl
  — this boy is saying
 The determiner  refer to a referent that is close to both the speaker and the listener(s). It is exactly like the English language determiner this.

Conjugation
The demonstratives can be used to express different things like:

Location: адэ "there", модэ "there", мыдэ "here".
Similarity: апхуэд "like that", мопхуэд "like", мыпхуэд "like this".

Pronouns

Personal pronouns
In Kabardian, personal pronouns are only expressed in first person, second person in singular and plural forms.

Demonstrative Pronouns
Demonstrative pronouns are мы "this", мо "that", а "that". There is a contradistinction between 'мы' and 'мо' on how far the referred object is. The pronoun 'а' is neutral on this matter. Third person pronouns are expressed as demonstrative pronouns.

Possessive Pronouns

Indefinite pronoun
In Kabardian whole one – зыгоруэ, Serves for indication of all notions corresponding to English words "someone", "something", "someone", "something", "sometime", "somewhere", etc. Зыгуэрэ changes either as noun – in number and in cases:

Verbs

In Kabardian, like all Northwest Caucasian languages, the verb is the most inflected part of speech. Verbs are typically head final and are conjugated for tense, person, number, etc. Some of Circassian verbs can be morphologically simple, some of them consist only of one morpheme, like: кӏуэ "go", щтэ "take". However, generally, Circassian verbs are characterized as structurally and semantically difficult entities. Morphological structure of a Circassian verb includes affixes (prefixes, suffixes) which are specific to the language. Verbs' affixes express meaning of subject, direct or indirect object, adverbial, singular or plural form, negative form, mood, direction, mutuality, compatibility and reflexivity, which, as a result, creates a complex verb, that consists of many morphemes and semantically expresses a sentence. For example: уакъыдэсэгъэпсэлъэжы "I am forcing you to talk to them again" consists of the following morphemes: у-а-къы-дэ-со-гъэ-псэлъэ-жы, with the following meanings: "you (у) with them (а)  from there (къы) together (дэ) I (со) am forcing (гъэ) to speak (псэлъэн) again (жы)".

Transitivity
Verbs in Kabardian can be transitive or intransitive.

In a sentence with a transitive verb, nouns in the absolutive case (marked as -р) play the role of direct object. In the sentences of this type the noun in the subject's position is in the ergative case (marked as -м):

Щӏалэм письмор етх "The boy is writing the letter";
Пхъащӏэм уадэр къэщтащ "The carpenter took out the hammer";
Хьэм тхьакIумкӏыхьыр къиубыдащ "The dog has caught the hares".

In these sentences the verbs етх "is writing", къэщтащ "took out", къиубыдащ "has caught" are transitive verbs, and the nouns письмор "letter", уадэр "hammer", тхьакIумкӏыхьыр "hare" are in the absolutive case (suffix -р) and express direct object in the sentences, while the nouns щӏалэм "boy", пхъащӏэм "carpenter", хьэм "dog" are subjects expressed in the ergative case.

In a sentence with an intransitive verb, there is no direct object, and the real subject is usually expressed by a noun in the absolutive case.

Жэмахъуэр щыт "The shepherd is standing (there)";
Пэсакӏуэр макӏуэ "The security guard is going";
Лӏыр мэжей "The man is sleeping".

In these sentences with intransitive verbs, nouns that play role of subject are expressed in the absolutive case: жэмахъуэ-р "shepherd", пэсакӏуэ-р "guard", лӏы-р "man".

There are verbs in the Kabardian language that in different contexts and situations can be used both as transitive and intransitive. For example:

Абджыр мэкъутэ "The glass is being broken",
Щӏалэм абджыр екъутэ "The boy is breaking the glass".

In the first sentence the verb мэкъутэ "is being broken" is used as an intransitive verb that creates an absolutive construction. In the second sentence the verb е-къутэ "is breaking" creates an ergative construction. Both of the verbs are formed from the verb къутэ-н "to break".

In the Kabardian language, intransitive verbs can have indirect objects in a sentence. The indirect objects are expressed by a noun in the oblique case (which is also marked as -м). For example:

Щӏалэр пщащэм йоплъ "The boy looking at the girl",
Лӏыр жыгым щӏэлъ "The man lays under the tree".
Щӏалэр тхылъым йоджэ "The boy reads the book".

In these sentences with intransitive verbs, nouns that play role of indirect object are expressed in the oblique case: пщащэ-м  "girl", жыгы-м "tree", тхылъы-м "book".

Intransitive verbs can be turned into transitive with the causative affix -гъэ- (meaning "to force, to make"). For example:

Ар мажэ "He is running", but Абы ар е-гъа-жэ "He forces him to run",
Ар матхэ "He is writing", but Абы ар е-гъа-тхэ "He makes him to write".

The verbs in the first sentences мажэ "is running", матхэ "is writing"  are intransitive, and the verbs in the second sentences  егъажэ "forces ... to run", егъатхэ "makes ... to write" are already transitive.

Tenses

Dynamic and static verbs
Kabardian verbs can be either dynamic or static.

Dynamic verbs express (process of) actions that are taking place (natural role of verbs in English):

Сэ сожэ: "I am running";
Сэ сокӏуэ: "I am going",
Сэ солъэгъу: "I am seeing it",
Сэ жызоӏэ: "I am saying it".

Static verbs express states or results of actions:

Сэ сыщытщ: "I am standing",
Сэ сыщылъщ: "I am lying.",
Сэ сыпхъащӏщ: "I am a carpenter",
Сэ сытрактористщ: "I am a tractor-driver".

Person
Kabardian verbs have different forms to express different person. These forms are, mostly, created with specific prefixes. Here is how it looks like in singular:

сы-тхэ "I write",
у-тхэ "You write",
ма-тхэ "writes";

and in plural:

ды-тхэ "We write",
фы-тхэ "You write",
ма-тхэ(-хэ) "They write".

Valency increasing

Moods

Imperative

The imperative mood denotes a command.

As its subject, the imperative mood can only have the second person as its subject. It is formed by stripping away all tense suffixes from the verb, with the specialty that the positive second-person singular form doesn't mark the subject. The negative is marked by мы-.

Conditional
Conditional mood is expressed with suffix -мэ: сы-к1уэ-мэ "if I go", сы-жэ-мэ "if I run", с-щ1э-мэ "if I do".

Concessive
Concessive mood is expressed with suffix -ми: сы-к1уэ-ми "even if I go", сы-жэ-ми "even if I run", с-щ1э-ми "even if I do".

Affirmative
Affirmative form is expressed with the affix -къэ: ма-кӏуэ-къэ "isn't he is going?", мэ-гыщӏэ-къэ "isn't he washing?".

Participle
Kabardian has a rich participle morphology.

Usually, all arguments of a verb can the pivot of participles. In addition, there are participles which may denote place, time, reason, manner, etc, which are independent from the arguments.

Other than not being able to change the grammatical category of mood, participle can mark for everything else what normal verbs can.

Absolutive Participle
The absolutive participle denotes the absolutive argument of a verb. If that verb is intransitive, it refers to the subject, if it is transitive it refers to the direct object. Absolutive participles are marked by a null morpheme.

Intransitive verbs:
 кIуэр: one, who goes (cf. кIуэн: to go)
 жэр: one, who runs (cf. жэн: to run)

Intransitive verbs with preverbs:
 ежьэр: one, who waits for Y (cf. ежьэн ): to wait for Y)
 еплъыр: one, who looks at Y (cf. еплъын: to look at Y)

Transitive verbs:
 илъэгъур: one, whom X sees (cf. лъагъун: to see Y)
 ишэр: one, whom X leads (cf. шэн: to lead Y)

Transitive verbs with preverb:
 зэхихыр: one, whom X hears (cf. зэхэхын: to hear Y)
 жыпIар: that, what you said (cf. жыIэн: to say Y)
 иритыр: that, what X gives to Z (cf. етын: to give Y to Z)

Ergative Participle
The ergative participle denotes the ergative argument of a verb. This participle is only present in transitive verbs and refers to the subject. It is marked by зы-.

Transitive verbs:
 зылъагъу: one, who sees Y (cf. лъагъун: to see Y)
 зышэр: one, who leads Y (cf. шэн: to lead Y)

Transitive verbs with preverb:
 жызыIар: one, who said Y (cf. жыIэн: to say Y)
 зэхэзыхыр: one, who hears Y (cf. зэхэхын: to hear Y)
 езытыр: one, who gives Y to Z (cf. етын: to give Y to Z)

Oblique Participle
The oblique participle denotes the oblique argument of a verb. This participle is present in every verb which has an oblique argument, usually only possible by having a preverb. It is marked by зы-. One can argue that it is simply the ergative participle, but simply applied on a preverb, however it may be useful to differentiate them, because oblique participles don't denote the subject of a verb (the ergative participle can only denote the subject) in addition they exist for transitive and intransitive verbs (the ergative participle only exists for transitive verbs).

Intransitive verbs with preverbs:
 зэжьэр: one, whom X waits for (cf. ежьэн ): to wait for Y)
 зэплъыр: one, who X looks at (cf. еплъын: to look at Y)
 сызытесыр: that, what I sit on (cf. тесын: to sit on Y)

Transitive verbs with preverb:
 зыритыр: one, to whom X gives Y (cf. етын: to give Y to Z)

Sentence Examples:
 дыгъуасэ хъыджэбз сызыхуэзар дахэщ: the girl, whom I met yesterday is pretty

Temporal Participle щы-
This participle denotes time as well as location, depending on the context. It is marked by щы-.

щылажьэр: when, X works

Sentence examples:
 Ар щылажьэр унэрщ: he works at home (lit. where he works is home)
 Ар щылажьэр сощIэ: I know where/when he works
 Уэ укъыщыкIуэжам щыгъуэ сэ унэм сыщыIакъым: I wasn't home when you arrived
 Си шыпхъур къыщалъхуам щыгъуэ сэ илъэсибл сыхъуат: When my sister was born, I was already seven years old.

Locative Participle зыдэ-
The locative participle denotes the place. It is marked by здэ-.
здэлажьэр: where, X works

Manner Participle зэры-
The manner participle denotes the manner. It is marked by зэры-.
зэрылажьэр: how, X works

Reason Participle щIэ-
The reason participle denotes the reason. It is marked by щIэ-.
щIэлажьэр: reason, why X works

Masdar

Masdar (a form of verb close to gerund) in the Kabardian language is expressed with the suffix -н:

тхы-н "a write (writing)",
жэ-н "a run (running)",
щтэ-н "a take (taking)",
псэлъэ-н "a talk (talking)",
дзы-н "a throw (throwing)".

Masdar has grammatical cases:

Absolutive жэны-р,
Ergative жэны-м,
Instrumental жэны-м-кӏэ,
Adverbial жэн-у

and different forms for different person:

сы-жэн "I will run",
у-жэн "you will run",
жэн "he will run".

Negative form
In the Adyghe language negative form of a word is expressed with different morphemes (prefixes, suffixes). In participles, adverbial participles, masdars, imperative, interrogative and other forms of verbs their negative from is expressed with the prefix -мы, which, usually, goes before the root morpheme, that describes the main meaning:

у-мы-тх "you don't write",
у-мы-кӏу "you don't go",
сы-къы-пхуэ-мы-щэмэ "if you can't bring me",
у-къа-мы-гъа-к1уэмэ "if you aren't forced to come".

In verbs the negative meaning can also be expressed with the suffix -къым, which usually goes after the suffixes of time-tenses. For example:

сы-тэджыр-къым "I am not getting up",
сы-тэ-джа-къым "I have not got up",
сы-тэджыну-къым "I will not get up".

Positional conjugation
In Kabardian, the positional prefixes are expressing being in different positions and places and can also express the direction of the verb. Here is the positional conjugation of some dynamic verbs, showing how the prefix changes the indicated direction of the verb:

Here is the positional conjugation of some verbs, showing how the root changes indicate position:

Examples:

щыт – [someone or something] stands (as a pose);

Iут – [someone or something] stands (behind);

щIэт – [someone or something] stands (under)

тет – [someone or something] stands (above)

дэт – [someone or something] stands (between), etc.

Adjectives
From the morphological point of view adjectives in the Circassian language are not very different from nouns. In combinations with nouns they lose their grammatical independence. Adjectives form their plural form the same way nouns do, they also use the same affixes to form different grammatical cases (from Absolutive to Adverbial).

Adjectives can be either qualitative or relative.

Adjectives can be in singular or plural form: хужы "white" (singular) – хужы-хэ-р "whites" (plural).

They switch grammatical cases similarly to nouns:

A qualitative adjective as a compliment in a sentence goes after the word it describes: к1алэ дэгъу "good boy", унэ лъагэ "high house"; a relative adjective goes before it: пхъэ уадэ "wooden hammer", гъущӏ пӏэкӏор "iron bed". In the second case adjectives do not change their form, only the appropriate nous do. For example: in plural – пхъэ унэ "wooden house".

In different grammatical cases:

Combining adjectives with nouns it is possible to produce a great lot of phrases: пщэщэ дахэ "beautiful girl", щӏалэ дэгъу "good boy", цӏыху кӏыхьэ "long man", гъуэгу занщӏэ "straight road", удз шхъуантӏэ "green grass" and so on. These phrases can be easily included into sentences. If a noun has a certain grammatical case, the adjective gets the suffix of the case instead of the noun, for example щӏэлэ лъэщы-р "the strong boy (abs.) and уадэ псынщӏэ-мкӏэ "using the light hammer (ins.).

Circassian qualitative adjectives also have comparative and superlative forms. For example: нэхъ хужы "whiter, more white" (comparative form) and янэхъ хужы "whitest, most white",

The Comparative degree is formed by auxiliary word нэхъ:

 Ар абы нэхъ лъагэ – he is higher than you,
 Нэхъ ины хъущ – He became bigger [More big became],
 Нэхъ лӏыгъэ къызхэбгъэлъын хуей – You must be braver.

The superlative degrees is formed by auxiliary word анахь (more than all...):

 Ар пщащэмэ янэхъ дахэ – She is the most beautiful among the girls,
 Ар псоми янэхъ лъагэ – It is the highest,
 Псэри шхын янэхъ дэгъумкӏэ игъэшхащ – (S)he feeds him with the tastiest meal,
 Ар псоми янэхъ лъэщ – He is the strongest.

Affixes
The following suffixes are added to nouns:

The following suffixes are added to adjectives:

Opinion
To indicate a thought or an opinion of someone, the prefix фӏэ~ (fʼa~) is added to the adjective. This can also be used on nouns but it is very uncommon. For example:
 дахэ "pretty" → фӏэдах "it's pretty for him.
 дэхагъ "as pretty" → фӏэдэхащ "it was pretty for him.
 ӏэфӏ "tasty" → фӏэӏэфӏ "it is tasty for him.
 плъыжьы "red" → фӏэплъыжь "it is red for him.

Scaliness of an adjective
The suffix ~гъэ (~ʁa) is appended to indicate a measure of a certain adjective. Usually it is used for measurable adjectives like length, height, weight, size, strength and speed but it can be used on any adjective such as good, tasty, beauty, etc. This suffix can be used to scale adjectives, for instance, the word ӏэфӏы-гъэ (from the adjective ӏэфӏы "tasty") can be used to express different levels/qualities of tastiness. This suffix turns the adjective to a noun.

кӏыхьэ /t͡ʃʼaħə/ – long → кӏыхьэгъэ /t͡ʃʼaħəʁa/ – length.
ӏэтыгъэ /ʔatəʁa/ – high → ӏэтыгъагъэ /ʔatəʁaːʁa/ – height.
псынщӏэ /psənɕʼa/ – fast → псынщӏагъэ /psənɕʼaːʁa/ – speed.
хуабэ /xʷaːba/ – hot → хуабагъэ /xʷabaːʁa/ – heat.
ӏувы /ʔʷəvə/ – wide → ӏувыгъэ /ʔʷəvəʁa/ – width.
дахэ /daːxa/ – beautiful → дэхагъэ /daxaːʁa/ – beauty.
ӏэфӏы /ʔafʼə/ – tasty → ӏэфӏыгъэ /ʔafʼəʁa/ – level of tastiness.
дэгъу /daʁʷə/ – good → дэгъугъэ /daʁʷəʁa/ – level of goodness.

State of the adjective
The suffix ~гъакӏэ (~ʁaːt͡ʃʼa) is appended to adjectives to form nouns meaning "the state of being the adjective", in contract to the suffix ~гъэ which is used to measure and scale the adjective. Some examples:

кӏыхьэ /t͡ʃʼaħə/ – long → кӏыхьэгъакӏэ /t͡ʃʼaħəʁaːt͡ʃʼa/ – lengthiness; longness.
псынщӏэ /psənɕʼa/ – fast → псынщӏэгъакӏэ /psənɕʼaʁaːt͡ʃʼa/ – speediness.
кӏуащӏэ /kʷʼaːɕʼa/ – strong → кӏуэщӏэгъакӏэ /kʷʼaɕʼaʁaːt͡ʃʼa/ – strongness.
лъэщ /ɬaɕ/ – strong → лъэщыгъакӏэ /ɬaɕəʁaːt͡ʃʼa/ – strongness.
дахэ /daːxa/ – pretty → дэхэгъакӏэ /daxaʁaːt͡ʃʼa/ – prettiness.

Adverbs
In the Kabardian language adverbs belong to these groups: adverbs of place, adverbs of time, adverbs of quality and adverbs of amount.

Adverbs of place
 адэ – "there" (invisible).
 модэ – "there" (visible).
 мыдэ – "here".

Adverbs of time
 нобэ – "today".
 дыгъуасэ – "yesterday".
 пщэдей – "tomorrow".
 мыгъэ – "this year".
 иджы – "now".
 иджыри – "still"
 иджыпсту – "right now".
 пщэдджыжьым – "at morning".
 шэджагъуэм – "at noon".
 жэщым – "in the night".
 зэманым – "in the past".
 етӏанэ – "afterwards"

Adverbs of amount
 мащӏэ – "few".
 тӏэкӏу – "a bit".
 тӏэкӏурэ – "few times, for a short period of time".
 куэд "a lot".
 куэдрэ "a lot of times, for a long period of time".
 ӏаджэ "many".

Adverbs of quality
Adverbs of this group are formed from the appropriate qualitative adjectives using the suffix ~у /~w/. Adverbs in this group describe the manner in which the verb was done.

 къабзэ "clean" → къабзу "cleanly"
 жыжьэ "far" → жыжьу "far",
 псынщӏэ "quick" → псынщӏэу "quickly",
 дахэ "beautiful" → даху "beautifully",
 благъэ "near" → благъу "nearly".
 лъэщ "powerful" → лъэщу "powerfully".
 щабэ "soft" → щабу "softly"
 быдэ "firm" → быду "firmly"

Unions
In English the word "and" is used to connect parts of speech with others, while in Circassian, there are different ways to connect different parts of speech with others.

 
The conjunctions ыкӏи /ət͡ʃəj/ "and" can also be used to connect different parts of speech.

Verbs: Щӏалэр йоджэ ыкӏи матхэ "The boy reads and writes".
Adjectives: Щӏалэр дахэ ыкӏи кӏыхьэ "The boy is handsome and tall".

Conjunctions
Conjunctions in the Circassian language play the same role like in English, they are used to connect together, in different ways, words or parts of a difficult sentence. According to structure of Circassian conjunctions they can be separated into two groups: simple and complex.

Simple conjunctions
Among simple Circassian conjunctions are:

 ыкӏи – "and".
 е – "or".
 ауэ – "but".

Complex conjunctions
 арщхьэк1э – "because".
 aт1э – "in spite of".
 хьэмэ – "or".
 сыту – "as".
 щхьэк1э – "though".
 сыт щхьэк1э – "because (of) / why".
 папщ1э – "for".
 папщ1эк1э – "as".
 щыгъуэ – "when".
 зэ-зэ – "first…then".
 е-е – "either-or".
 къудейуэ – "as soon as".
 ару – "just".
 пэтми – "although".
 щытмэ – "if".
 ипкъ итк1э – "therefore".
 къыхэк1к1э – "because / that’s why".

Particles
In the Circassian language participles are different both by their semantics and structure. Semantically they fall into the following groups: affirmative, negative, interrogative, intensive, indicatory and stimulating.

 дыдэ – "quite, very".
 уеблэмэ – "even".
 пIэрэ – "whether, really".
 мис – "here".
 мес – "there (near by)".
 кхъы1э – "please".
 нэхъ – "more".
 нэхърэ – "more than".
 хьэуэ – "no".
 нтIэ – "yes".
 акъудей (аркъудей) – "quite not".
 къудей – "just now".

Postpositions
In the Circassian language, as well as in other Ibero-Caucasian languages, role of prepositions belongs to postpositions. It is difficult to define the exact count of postpositions in the Circassian language, because even such major parts of speech as nouns (from the point of view of their functionality) sometimes can be included into the group, together with some verb prefixes. For example, in the sentence Тхылъыр столым телъ "The book is lying on the table" the noun has no preposition, but the meaning remains clear because in the verb те-лъ "is lying" the prefix те- expresses something's being on a surface, so this form of the verb literally means "on the surface is lying".

Nouns and adverbs sometimes play role of postpositions. For example, nous that describe different parts of human body (head, nose, side and so on) sometimes function as postpositions. For example: Фызыр лӏым ипэ иту кӏуащ "The wife went in front of the husband" (the preposition "in front of" in the Circassian sentence is expressed by the phrase ипэ иту "being in front of his nose").

Nouns and pronouns combine with a postposition in the ergative grammatical case only. For example, the postposition деж "near, beside" requires a word in the ergative case:

 жыгы-м деж "near the tree".

Postpositions can attach possessive prefixes to themselves. For example, in singular:

 сэ с-а-деж "near me",
 о у-а-деж "near you",
 абы и деж "near him";

in plural:

 дэ д-а-деж "near us",
 фэ ф-а-деж "near you",
 ахэмэ я деж "near them".

The following words are used as postpositions in the Circassian language:

 ипIэкIэ "before".
 пщ1ондэ "before".
 щыгъуэ "during".
 икIуэцIкI "inside".
 лъандэ "since".
 къэскIэ "until".
 нэс "until".
 деж "near".
 дежкIэ "at".
 иужь "after".
 пащхьэ "in front of".
 щ1ыбагъ "behind".
 щIагъ "under".
 нэмыщI "except".
 фIэкIа "except".
 къэс "every".

Word Formation

Compounding

Noun + Noun
 адэ-анэ: parents (cf. адэ: father, анэ: mother)
 джэдкъаз: domesticated bird (cf. джэд: chicken, къэз: goose)
 мэкъумэш: harvest (cf. мэкъу: hay, анэ: millet)
 мастэIуданэ: sewing kit (cf. мастэ: ??, Iуданэ: needle)
 джанэгъуэншэдж: set of clothes (cf. джанэ: shirt, гъуэншэдж: pants)

Noun + Verb
This strategy is very similar to the English one, which gives words like pickpocket, cutthroat, scarecrow.

 пхъащIэ: carpenter (cf. пхъэ: wood, щIэн: to do Y)
 пщэдэлъ: scarf (cf. пщэ: wood, дэлъын: to lie at Y)
 псышэ: water carrier (cf. псы: water, шэн: to lead Y)

Derivation

-ей
A suffix denoting a tree.

 дей: walnut/hazelnut tree (cf. дэ: nut)
 абрикосей: apricot tree (cf. абрикос: apricot)
 балией: cherry tree (cf. балий: cherry)

зэ-
 зэадэзэкъуэ: father and son
 зэанэзэпхъу: mother and daughter
 зэдэлъхузэшыпхъу: brother and sister
 зэлӀзэфыз: husband and wife
 зэныбжьэгъу: friends

-тэ
This is an unproductive suffix, which creates new verbs from other verbs.

 лъэтэн: to fly (cf. лэн: to jump)
 кIуэтэн: to move (cf. кIуэн: to go)
 къутэн: to break Y (cf. къун: to beat Y up)

Numbers
Numbers from zero to ten are specific words
1 зы 
2  тӀу 
3  щы 
4  плӀы 
5  тху 
6  хы 
7 блы 
8  и 
9 бгъу 
10 пщӏы 
Numbers from eleven to nineteen are built with the word for ten, followed by кӏу and the unit digit:
11 пщӏыкӀуз 
12 пщӏыкӀутIу  
13 пщӏыкӀущ 
14 пщӏыкӀуплI  
15 пщӏыкӀутху  
16 пщӏыкӀух 
17 пщӏыкӀубл  
18 пщӏыкӀуй 
19 пщӏыкӀубгъу }
The tens follow a vigesimal system from forty up, with the exception of fifty:
20 тӀощӏ  (20)
21 тӀощӏэ зырэ  (20 and 1)
22 тӀощӏэ тIурэ  (20 and 2)
23 тӀощӏэ щырэ  (20 and 3)
...
30 щэщӏ  (30)
31 щэщӏрэ зырэ  (30 and 1)
32 щэщӏрэ тIурэ  (30 and 2)
...
40 плIыщI  (20 × 2)
50 тхущI, (half-hundred)
60 хыщI, (20 × 3)
70 блыщI  (20 × 3 and 10)
80 ищI  (20 × 4)
90 бгъущI  (20 × 4 and 10)

One hundred is щэ (ɕa). The hundreds are formed by the hundred word root (щ (ɕ)) followed by -и-

(-i-) and the multiplier digit root.
100 щэ (ɕa)
101 щэрэ зырэ (ɕara zəra) (100 and 1)
110 щэрэ пщӏырэ (ɕara pʃʼəra) (100 and 10)
200 щитӀу (ɕitʷʼ) (100 × 2)
201 щитӀурэ зырэ  (ɕitʷʼəra zəra) (200 × 2 and 1)
300 щищ (ɕiɕ) (100 × 3)
400 щиплӀ (ɕipɬʼ) (100 × 4)
500 щитху (ɕitxʷ) (100 × 5)
600 щих (ɕix) (100 × 6)
700 щибл (ɕibɮ) (100 × 7)
800 щий (ɕij) (100 × 8)
900 щибгъу (ɕibʁʷ) (100 × 9)
One thousand is мин (min). The thousands are formed by the thousand word root (мин (məjn))

followed by -и- (-i-) and the multiplier digit root.
1000 мин (min)
1001 минрэ зырэ (minra zəra) (1000 and 1)
1010 минрэ пщӏырэ (minra pʃʼəra) (1000 and 10)
1100 минрэ щэрэ (minra ɕara) (1000 and 100)
2000 минитӀу (minitʷʼ) (1000 × 2)
3000 минищ (miniɕ) (1000 × 3)
4000 миниплӀ (minipɬʼ) (1000 × 4)
5000 минитху (minitxʷ) (1000 × 5)
6000 миних (minix) (1000 × 6)
7000 минибл (minibɮ) (1000 × 7)
8000 миний (minij) (1000 × 8)
9000 минибгъу (minibʁʷ) (1000 × 9)
10000 минипщӏ (minipʃʼ) (1000 × 10)
11000 минипщӀыкӀуз (minipʃʼəkʷʼəz) (1000 × 11)
12000 минипщӀыкӀутIу (minipʃʼəkʷʼətʷʼ) (1000 × 12)
20000 минитӀощӏ (minitʷʼaɕʼə) (1000 × 20)
100000 минищэ (miniɕa) (1000 × 100)
200000 минищитӀу  (miniɕitʷʼ) (1000 × 200)

When composed, the hundred word takes the -рэ (-ra) suffix, as well as the ten and the unit if any (e.g.: щэрэ зырэ (ɕara zəra) [101], щэрэ тIурэ (ɕara tʷʼəra) [102], щэрэ пщӀыкӀузырэ (pʃʼəkʷʼətʷʼəra) [111], щитӀурэ щэщӀырэ плIырэ (ɕitʷʼəra ɕat͡ʃəra pɬʼəra) [234]).

Ordinal numbers
Except апэрэ/япэрэ – first (aːpara/jaːpara) are formed by prefix я- (jaː-) and suffix – нэрэ (- nara). For

example: ятIунэрэ – second (jaːtʷʼənara), ящынэрэ – third (jaːɕənara), яплIынэрэ – fourth (jaːpɬʼənara).
first – Япэ 
second – ЕтIуанэ 
third – Ещанэ 
firth – Еянэ 
tenth – ЕпщIанэ 
eleventh – ЕпщыкIузанэ 
sixteenth. – ЕпщыкIуханэ

Discrete numbers
Зырыз –  in ones, one by one
ТIурытI –  in twos, two by two
Щырыщ – in threes, three by three
ПлIырыплI –  in fours, four by four
Тхурытху – in fives, five by five
Хырых – in sixes, six by six
Блырыбл – in sevens, seven by seven
Ири – in eights, eight by eight
Бгъурыбгъу – in nines, nine by nine
ПщIырыпщI – in tens, ten by ten

Fractional numbers
half (1÷2) – Ныкъуэ 
one third (1÷3) – щанэ 
two thirds (2÷3) – щанитӏу  (1÷3 × 2)
one fourth (1÷4) – плӀанэ 
two fourths (2÷4) – плӀанитӏу  (1÷4 × 2)
three fourths (3÷4) – плӀанищ  (1÷4 × 3)
one fifth (1÷5) – тфанэ 
one sixth (1÷6) – ханэ 
one seventh (1÷7) – бланэ 
one eighth (1÷8) – янэ 
one ninth (1÷9) – бгъуанэ 
one tenth (1÷10) – пщӀанэ 
one eleventh (1÷11) – пщӀыкӏузанэ 
one twelfth (1÷12) – пщӀыкӏутӏуанэ 
one twentieth (1÷20) – тӏощӏанэ 
one hundredth (1÷100) – щанэ

See also
 Kabardian language
 Circassia
 Circassians

References

Bibliography
 Аркадьев, П. М.; Ландер, Ю. А.; Летучий, А. Б.; Сумбатова, Н. Р.; Тестелец, Я. Г. Введение. Основные сведения об адыгейском языке в кн.: "Аспекты полисинтетизма: очерки по грамматике адыгейского языка" под ред.: П. М. Аркадьев, А. Б. Летучий, Н. Р. Сумбатова, Я. Г. Тестелец. Москва: РГГУ, 2009 (Arkadiev, P. M.; Lander, Yu. A.; Letuchiy, A. B.; Sumbatova, N. R.; Testelets, Ya. G. Introduction. Basic information about Adyghe language in "Aspects of polysyntheticity: studies on Adyghe grammar" edited by: P. M. Arkadiev, A. B. Letuchiy, N. R. Sumbatova, Ya. G. Testelets. Moscow, RGGU, 2009) (in Russian) 
 Kabardian Verbal Affixes: Collected, arranged and edited by Amjad Jaimoukha : .
 Ranko Matasović, A short grammar of east Circassian (Kabardian) : .

Northwest Caucasian grammars
Kabardian language